Jarred Cannon is an American politician serving as a Republican member of the West Virginia House of Delegates from the 21st district, elected in the 2022 general election. He previously served the 22nd district after being appointed by Jim Justice in 2022 following the resignation of his predecessor Joe Jeffries from the legislature.

Cannon won the 2022 general election running as the Republican nominee in the 21st district. Before his appointment to the legislature, Cannon served as the Director of the West Virginia Republican Party's Victory Program and as campaign manager for the congressional re-election campaign of Evan Jenkins. Cannon also serves on the board of the Ohio-West Virginia Youth Leadership Association (YLA) and owns Athena Consulting, a public relations firm.

Electoral History

2022 
General Election

2018

2016

References 

Living people
Republican Party members of the West Virginia House of Delegates
21st-century American politicians
West Virginia University alumni
1997 births